The Mexican dog-faced bat (Cynomops mexicanus) is a bat species of the family Molossidae from Central America. It is found from Nayarit in Mexico to Costa Rica at elevations up to 1500 m. It was formerly considered a subspecies of C. greenhalli. It roosts in deciduous and evergreen forest, and is usually found near small bodies of water.

Taxonomy and etymology

It was described as a subspecies of Greenhall's dog-faced bat (Cynomops greenhalli) in 1967 by Jones and Genoways.
At the time, Greenhall's dog-faced bat was in the genus Molossops, so the Mexican dog-faced bat initially had the trinomen Molossops greenhalli mexicanus.
When Cynomops was recognized as a valid genus rather than a subgenus of Molossops, Greenhall's dog-faced bat became part of the new genus.
However, it wasn't until 2002 that the Mexican dog-faced bat was promoted to full species status. It is the most basal member of Cynomops.
Its species name "mexicanus" is Latin meaning "from Mexico."

Description
It is a relatively large free-tailed bat. It weighs . Fur color is dark brown or reddish brown overall, but lighter on the stomach.

Biology
It is nocturnal, and roosts in sheltered places during the day such as inside hollow trees.

References

External links
An image of this species

Cynomops
Mammals described in 1967